Wierzchowisko may refer to the following places:
Wierzchowisko, Lesser Poland Voivodeship (south Poland)
Wierzchowisko, Łódź Voivodeship (central Poland)
Wierzchowisko, Silesian Voivodeship (south Poland)